Carex baldensis is a species of sedge. Its native range is the Alps.

References

External links
 Carex baldensis L. | Plants of the World Online | Kew Science
 Carex baldensis L. - Encyclopedia of Life
 Carex baldensis - Observation.org
 Carex baldensis - SEINet Portal Network

baldensis
Flora of Austria
Flora of Germany
Flora of Italy
Flora of Switzerland